Skeletocutis azorica is a species of poroid fungus in the family Polyporaceae. It has only been found in Portugal.

Taxonomy
It was first described in 1977 as a member of the now-defunct genus Incrustoporia by Derek Reid. Walter Jülich transferred it to Skeletocutis in 1982.

Description
The hyphal system is monomitic, meaning it contains only generative hyphae. These hyphae have clamps and are hyaline, thin-walled, richly branched, measuring 2–3 µm in diameter. Those close to the substrate are heavily encrusted. Cystidia are absent from the hymenium. Fusoid cystidioles present in the hymenium, thin-walled, not encrusted, 9–12 by 3–4 µm, with a basal clamp. The basidia are ovoid to clavate, four-sterigmate, 9–12 by 4–5 µm, with a basal clamp. Spores are oblong-ellipsoid, slightly curved, hyaline, smooth, do not stain with Melzer's reagent, and measure 3–4 by 1.5–2 µm.

Habitat and distribution
Skeletocutis azorica is found only in the Azores of Portugal, where it causes a white rot on woody substrates of Pinus, Cryptomeria, and also on the fern Pteridium.

References

Fungi described in 1977
Fungi of Europe
azorica
Taxa named by Derek Reid